ANSEL, the American National Standard for Extended Latin Alphabet Coded Character Set for Bibliographic Use, was a character set used in text encoding. It provided a table of coded values for the representation of characters of the extended Latin alphabet in machine-readable form for thirty-five languages written in the Latin alphabet and for fifty-one romanized languages. ANSEL adds 63 graphic characters to ASCII, including 29 combining diacritic characters.

The initial revision of ANSEL was released in 1985, and before 1993 it was registered as Registration #231 in the ISO International Register of Coded Character Sets to be Used with Escape Sequences. The standard was reaffirmed in 2003 although it has been administratively withdrawn by ANSI effective 14 February 2013.

The requirement of hardware capable of overprinting accents doomed this from ever becoming a popular extended ASCII.

Code page layout

The following table shows ANSI/NISO Z39.47-1993 (R2003). Non-ASCII characters are shown with their Unicode code point. A combining diacritic precedes the spacing character on which it should be superimposed (in Unicode the combining diacritic is after the base character).

Use

GEDCOM
The GEDCOM specification for exchanging genealogical data refers to ANSEL (ANSI/NISO Z39.47-1985) as a valid text encoding for GEDCOM files and extends it with additional characters which are shown in the following table.

MARC21
The Extended Latin character set from MARC 21 is synchronized with ANSEL but additionally supports the  eszett (ß) character at C7 and the euro sign (€) at C8.

References

External links 
National Information Standards Organization (NISO)
American National Standards Institute (ANSI)
ANSI/NISO Z39.47-1985
ANSI/NISO Z39.47-1993 (R2003) 
ISO-IR 231
MARC 21 Code Table Extended Latin (ANSEL)

American Library Association
Character sets